Unciger is a genus of millipedes belonging to the family Julidae.

The species of this genus are found in Europe.

Species:
 Unciger foetidus (Koch, 1838) 
 Unciger kubanus Lohmander, 1936

References

Julida
Millipede genera